Japanese football in 2017.

Promotion and relegation 
Teams relegated from J1 League
 Nagoya Grampus
 Shonan Bellmare
 Avispa Fukuoka

Teams promoted to J1 League
 Hokkaido Consadole Sapporo
 Shimizu S-Pulse
 Cerezo Osaka

Teams relegated from J2 League
 Giravanz Kitakyushu

Teams promoted to J2 League
 Oita Trinita

Teams relegated from J3 League
 No relegation to the Japan Football League

Teams promoted to J3 League
 Azul Claro Numazu

Teams promoted to Japan Football League
FC Imabari
Veertien Mie

J1 League

J2 League

J3 League

Japan Football League

National team (Men)

Results

Players statistics

National team (Women)

Results

Players statistics

References

External links

 
Seasons in Japanese football